The Cabinet of the state of Manipur, India, forms the executive branch of the Government of Manipur.

This is a list of minister from N. Biren Singh  cabinets starting from 21 March 2022. N. Biren Singh  is the leader of BJP, who was sworn in the Chief Ministers of Manipur for the second time on 21 March 2022. Here is the list of the ministers of his ministry.

Council of Ministers 

|}

See also 
 Government of Manipur
 Directorate of Language Planning and Implementation

References 

Lists of current Indian state and territorial ministries
Bharatiya Janata Party

Naga People's Front
Manipur ministries